The fifth series of The Bill, a British television drama, consisted of 104 episodes, broadcast between 3 January – 28 December 1989. The series was first released on DVD as part of the Collection 3 and Collection 4 DVD boxsets in Australia, made available on 8 August – 7 November 2007, respectively. The first four episodes of the series were later issued on DVD in the United Kingdom, under the title Volume 4, on 15 March 2010. The next thirteen episodes of series 5 were released on DVD in the UK, under the title Volume 5, on 11 July 2011, the next 48 episodes of Series five were released on DVD in the UK under the title Volume 6, on 15 October 2012 and the remaining episodes were released on DVD in the UK under the title Volume 7, on 2 September 2013. The series was later reissued as two half-series boxsets in Australia, released on 7 March 2012. The above DVD artwork is taken from the most recent Australian release. It features images of DC Jim Carver and Sgt. Bob Cryer. The British volume artwork features a collage image featuring a variety of characters from across the season. The original Collection boxsets contained sole images of PC Pete Ramsey and PC June Ackland respectively.

Cast/Crew Commentaries
A number of The Bill Video/Audio Commentaries for Series 5 episodes have been recorded with cast and crew, including actors Colin Blumenau (P.C. Taffy Edwards), Larry Dann (Sgt. Alec Peters), Trudie Goodwin (W.P.C. June Ackland), Robert Hudson (P.C. Yorkie Smith), Chris Humphreys (P.C. Richard Turnham), Jon Iles (D.C. Mike Dashwood), Andrew Mackintosh (D.S. Alastair Greig) Nick Reding (P.C. Pete Ramsey) and Barbara Thorn (Insp. Christine Frazer), writers Garry Lyons, Christopher Russell and J.C. Wilsher, directors Niall Leonard and Jan Sargent.

Cast changes

Arrivals
 PC Timothy Able
 WPC Norika Datta
 PC George Garfield
 DS Alistair Greig
 Sgt Stuart Lamont
 WPC Cathy Marshall
 PC Dave Quinnan
 PC Richard Turnham
 PC Phil Young

Departures
 WPC Claire Brind
 PC Robin Frank
 PC Malcolm Haynes
 PC Pete Ramsey
 PC Yorkie Smith

Episodes

References

1989 British television seasons
The Bill series